Psychotria crassipetala is a species of plant in the family Rubiaceae. This species was firstly described by E. Petit in 1964 and believed endemic to Kenya for a long time, but recently found also in Tanzania.

References

 

crassipetala
Flora of Kenya
Flora of Tanzania
Endangered flora of Africa
Taxonomy articles created by Polbot